Valashid (also Romanized as Valāshīd; also known as Valāshed) is a village in Tatarestaq Rural District, Baladeh District, Nur County, Mazandaran Province, Iran. At the 2006 census, its population was 120, in 35 families.

References 

Populated places in Nur County